Moscow City Duma District 5 is one of 45 constituencies in Moscow City Duma. The constituency has covered parts of North-Western and Western Moscow since 2014. From 1993-2005 District 5 also was based in Northern Moscow; from 2005-2014 the constituency was based in North-Eastern Moscow (it actually overlapped the entirety of State Duma Babushkinsky constituency in 2005-2009).

Members elected

Election results

2001

|-
! colspan=2 style="background-color:#E9E9E9;text-align:left;vertical-align:top;" |Candidate
! style="background-color:#E9E9E9;text-align:left;vertical-align:top;" |Party
! style="background-color:#E9E9E9;text-align:right;" |Votes
! style="background-color:#E9E9E9;text-align:right;" |%
|-
|style="background-color:"|
|align=left|Sergey Osadchy (incumbent)
|align=left|Independent
|
|63.07%
|-
|style="background-color:"|
|align=left|Pyotr Zvyagintsev
|align=left|Independent
|
|12.74%
|-
|style="background-color:"|
|align=left|Sergey Degtyarev
|align=left|Independent
|
|6.36%
|-
|style="background-color:"|
|align=left|Andrey Kobozev
|align=left|Independent
|
|1.75%
|-
|style="background-color:#000000"|
|colspan=2 |against all
|
|11.39%
|-
| colspan="5" style="background-color:#E9E9E9;"|
|- style="font-weight:bold"
| colspan="3" style="text-align:left;" | Total
| 
| 100%
|-
| colspan="5" style="background-color:#E9E9E9;"|
|- style="font-weight:bold"
| colspan="4" |Source:
|
|}

2004

|-
! colspan=2 style="background-color:#E9E9E9;text-align:left;vertical-align:top;" |Candidate
! style="background-color:#E9E9E9;text-align:left;vertical-align:top;" |Party
! style="background-color:#E9E9E9;text-align:right;" |Votes
! style="background-color:#E9E9E9;text-align:right;" |%
|-
|style="background-color:"|
|align=left|Viktor Ivanov
|align=left|United Russia
|
|42.06%
|-
|style="background-color:"|
|align=left|Lyudmila Lipina
|align=left|Liberal Democratic Party
|
|15.10%
|-
|style="background-color:"|
|align=left|Yelena Guseva
|align=left|Independent
|
|12.71%
|-
|style="background-color:#000000"|
|colspan=2 |against all
|
|26.50%
|-
| colspan="5" style="background-color:#E9E9E9;"|
|- style="font-weight:bold"
| colspan="3" style="text-align:left;" | Total
| 
| 100%
|-
| colspan="5" style="background-color:#E9E9E9;"|
|- style="font-weight:bold"
| colspan="4" |Source:
|
|}

2005

|-
! colspan=2 style="background-color:#E9E9E9;text-align:left;vertical-align:top;" |Candidate
! style="background-color:#E9E9E9;text-align:left;vertical-align:top;" |Party
! style="background-color:#E9E9E9;text-align:right;" |Votes
! style="background-color:#E9E9E9;text-align:right;" |%
|-
|style="background-color:"|
|align=left|Tatyana Portnova (incumbent)
|align=left|United Russia
|
|43.52%
|-
|style="background-color:"|
|align=left|Ivan Novitsky (incumbent)
|align=left|Yabloko-United Democrats
|
|17.74%
|-
|style="background-color:"|
|align=left|Vadim Solyanikov
|align=left|Rodina
|
|14.99%
|-
|style="background-color:"|
|align=left|Vadim Solovyov
|align=left|Communist Party
|
|11.59%
|-
|style="background-color:"|
|align=left|Aleksandr Ivanov
|align=left|Liberal Democratic Party
|
|4.01%
|-
|style="background-color:"|
|align=left|Sergey Lebedev
|align=left|Independent
|
|3.21%
|-
| colspan="5" style="background-color:#E9E9E9;"|
|- style="font-weight:bold"
| colspan="3" style="text-align:left;" | Total
| 
| 100%
|-
| colspan="5" style="background-color:#E9E9E9;"|
|- style="font-weight:bold"
| colspan="4" |Source:
|
|}

2009

|-
! colspan=2 style="background-color:#E9E9E9;text-align:left;vertical-align:top;" |Candidate
! style="background-color:#E9E9E9;text-align:left;vertical-align:top;" |Party
! style="background-color:#E9E9E9;text-align:right;" |Votes
! style="background-color:#E9E9E9;text-align:right;" |%
|-
|style="background-color:"|
|align=left|Tatyana Portnova (incumbent)
|align=left|United Russia
|
|55.72%
|-
|style="background-color:"|
|align=left|Vladimir Lakeyev
|align=left|Communist Party
|
|16.53%
|-
|style="background-color:"|
|align=left|Sergey Cherepanov
|align=left|A Just Russia
|
|11.31%
|-
|style="background-color:"|
|align=left|Aleksandr Ivanov
|align=left|Liberal Democratic Party
|
|7.33%
|-
|style="background-color:"|
|align=left|Sergey Lebedev
|align=left|Independent
|
|4.21%
|-
| colspan="5" style="background-color:#E9E9E9;"|
|- style="font-weight:bold"
| colspan="3" style="text-align:left;" | Total
| 
| 100%
|-
| colspan="5" style="background-color:#E9E9E9;"|
|- style="font-weight:bold"
| colspan="4" |Source:
|
|}

2014

|-
! colspan=2 style="background-color:#E9E9E9;text-align:left;vertical-align:top;" |Candidate
! style="background-color:#E9E9E9;text-align:left;vertical-align:top;" |Party
! style="background-color:#E9E9E9;text-align:right;" |Votes
! style="background-color:#E9E9E9;text-align:right;" |%
|-
|style="background-color:"|
|align=left|Oleg Soroka
|align=left|United Russia
|
|32.55%
|-
|style="background-color:"|
|align=left|Sergey Baburin
|align=left|Communist Party
|
|24.36%
|-
|style="background-color:"|
|align=left|Maksim Katz
|align=left|Independent
|
|22.99%
|-
|style="background-color:"|
|align=left|Yelena Morozova
|align=left|Yabloko
|
|10.85%
|-
|style="background-color:"|
|align=left|Vitaly Zolochevsky
|align=left|Liberal Democratic Party
|
|6.03%
|-
| colspan="5" style="background-color:#E9E9E9;"|
|- style="font-weight:bold"
| colspan="3" style="text-align:left;" | Total
| 
| 100%
|-
| colspan="5" style="background-color:#E9E9E9;"|
|- style="font-weight:bold"
| colspan="4" |Source:
|
|}

2019

|-
! colspan=2 style="background-color:#E9E9E9;text-align:left;vertical-align:top;" |Candidate
! style="background-color:#E9E9E9;text-align:left;vertical-align:top;" |Party
! style="background-color:#E9E9E9;text-align:right;" |Votes
! style="background-color:#E9E9E9;text-align:right;" |%
|-
|style="background-color:"|
|align=left|Roman Babayan
|align=left|Independent
|
|47.17%
|-
|style="background-color:"|
|align=left|Anastasia Udaltsova
|align=left|Communist Party
|
|39.72%
|-
|style="background-color:"|
|align=left|Ksenia Domozhirova
|align=left|A Just Russia
|
|5.59%
|-
|style="background-color:"|
|align=left|Aleksey Litvinov
|align=left|Liberal Democratic Party
|
|4.29%
|-
| colspan="5" style="background-color:#E9E9E9;"|
|- style="font-weight:bold"
| colspan="3" style="text-align:left;" | Total
| 
| 100%
|-
| colspan="5" style="background-color:#E9E9E9;"|
|- style="font-weight:bold"
| colspan="4" |Source:
|
|}

Notes

References

Moscow City Duma districts